Iris Komar is a retired German swimmer who won a gold medal in the 4×100 m freestyle relay at the 1970 European Aquatics Championships, setting a new world record. Between 1967 and 1971 she won four national titles in the same event.

Sports psychology
She graduated from the Leipzig University in psychology and sports training. In 1993 she defended her PhD at the same university titled “Bewegungs- und Trainingswissenschaft” (Movement and Training Science) and later worked in sports psychology at Forschungsinstitut and clinical psychology  at the University Hospital in Leipzig.

She speaks German, English, Dutch and Russian.

Publications
Komar published a series of books on swimming training of children, including the following

References

Living people
German female swimmers
East German female freestyle swimmers
European Aquatics Championships medalists in swimming
Year of birth missing (living people)